Petar Stojkoviḱ (born September 11, 1985) is a Macedonian actor who works in theater, television and film. He is also an LGBT human rights activist.

Early life and career
Stojkovikj was born in Skopje, SFR Yugoslavia. His mother, Ankica Stojkovikj (née Shishkova; 1951–2015), is a hair-dresser, and his father, Miodrag Stojkovikj (1937–2007), was a chemical technician. He in the only child in the family. He was raised an Orthodox Christian, but later became an atheist, and grew up in Skopje, where he attended Miladinovci Brothers High School. He received his B.F.A. in Acting at the Faculty of Dramatic Arts in Skopje and was in the class of professor Vladimir Milchin and assistant professor Suzana Kirandziska.

While at the Faculty of Dramatic Arts he played a variety of roles onstage, from the young and naive Andrei Sergeyevich Prozorov in "Three Sisters" by Anton Pavlovich Chekhov to a deeply cruel and twisted Husband in "Round Dance" by Arthur Schnitzler. After his graduation, the Theater for Children and Youth - Skopje invited him as a guest actor in "Alice in Wonderland" in May 2011. In December 2011 he signed a contract for the role of The Cowardly Lion in "The Wizard of Oz", a musical directed by Bonjo Lungov.

He has performed at the Academic Stage of the Faculty of Dramatic Arts - Skopje, Macedonian National Theater - Skopje, Children's Theater Center - Skopje, Theater for Children and Youth - Skopje and attended the following festivals: Vojdan Cernodrinski - Prilep (North Macedonia), DAF - Kocani (North Macedonia), Skomrahi - Skopje (North Macedonia), SKENA UP - Pristina (Kosovo), Skopje Summer Festival (North Macedonia), Ohrid Summer Festival (North Macedonia), FIST - Belgrade (Serbia), Kotor International Festival of Children's Theaters (Montenegro), International Festival of Children's Theaters - Banja Luka (Bosnia and Herzegovina), Subotica International Festival of Children's Theatres (Serbia)  etc.

Petar had his very first appearance on TV in the "Circle" (2008), a TV serial directed by Miodrag Magyar, aired on SKY NET, a local TV station. The same year he was given a leading role in "Speak Macedonian", TV Mini-series produced by Macedonian Radio Television. The shooting of the show took place on different locations in Skopje, from January to April 2008.
In 2008 he participated in a TV commercial for "Cipso" (chips) produced by Digital Star, a film production house from Skopje, North Macedonia.

In 2010 he made his onscreen debut as a supporting actor in "Pink Panties Thursday", a short movie (runtime: 24 min) written, produced and directed by the controversial director Sofija Teodor. The movie explores the topic of mixed-orientation marriage and tells the hidden story behind the life of a bisexual husband facing his deepest frustrations and prejudice by the society. It was aired on many TV stations in the Republic of North Macedonia.

Awards 
The acting crew from "The Wizard of Oz", a musical produced by Theater for Children and Youth - Skopje, received an award for outstanding acting performance on 19th Subotica International Festival of Children's Theatres (Serbia) in 2012.

Human Rights Activism 
Petar Stojkovikj is former member of the executive board at the Helsinki Committee for Human Rights of the Republic of Macedonia.

During 2011 Macedonian protests Petar marched the street every day. He was among the most active ones in the media. He also took part in a public hearing organized by the Alliance of Liberals and Democrats for Europe held in the European Parliament (Brussels, September 20, 2011) where he shared his experience from the protests regarding the media coverage. He also spoke about the pressures to silence the press, public threats, labeling and degradation he had by the pro-government media, as well as the attempts by the government of the Republic of North Macedonia to cover up the truth for the murder of Martin Neškoski.

In 2012 he was part of the March for tolerance traditionally organized by Helsinki Committee for Human Rights of the Republic of Macedonia. This year's March for Tolerance, organized to mark November 16, the International Day of Tolerance, was dedicated to the LGBT population in North Macedonia, which has been subjected to a prolonged homophobic campaign that intensified over the last month, with the attack on the newly opened LGBTi Support Centre in Skopje and several homophobic statements by high-ranking Government officials.

The March also aimed to express its support for the women which are also targeted by a negative hate-speech campaign that aims to exclude and eliminate all diversity in the society and focused on the women whose priorities don't fit the traditional role of women in society.

The Helsinki Committee and the Coalition for sexual and healthcare rights demanded from the Government of the Republic of North Macedonia to change the Criminal Code in the segment of sanctions for hate crimes and hate speech on grounds of sexual orientation and gender identity.

In August 2013, Stojkovikj was one of the international guests invited by VVD to attend Amsterdam Gay Pride and speak about their respective countries and problems in Amsterdam. VVD aims to invite four advocates of LGBT rights from across Europe to emphasize the international character of their struggle for equal rights. During Petar's stay in Amsterdam, he had meetings with representatives from governmental and non-governmental organizations in Netherlands. He also held a public speech about the position and access to human rights of the LGBTI community in the Republic of North Macedonia.

Being a Foster Family 
Petar encouraged his parents to become one of the foster families in his country and provide love and care for the unfortunate children. So far 21 children were temporary accommodated in his home. One of them, an autistic girl, has been there for 13 years. The young Gordana Gligorovska recently turned up 14 years.

In 2011, due to some obstacles and inconsistencies in the law, Petar had to fight a legal battle with the system in order to keep the little Gordana at home and didn't let Social Services put her in an institution for mentally disabled. The press published the story and it immediately drawn people's attention. Soon after this, because of the enormous public pressure by the nation, the Ministry of Labor and Social Policy of the Republic of North Macedonia decided it will be in the best interest for the child to stay in the family. The officials promised that these problems in the law which were brought up to their attention in Gordana's case will be discussed by the Committee on labor and social policy in the Macedonian Parliament.

Theater

Film and Television

References

External links
 Petar Stojkovikj | Official Website

1985 births
Living people
Male actors from Skopje
Macedonian male stage actors
Macedonian male film actors
Macedonian male television actors
Macedonian people of Serbian descent
Macedonian atheists